is a train station on Kintetsu Railway's Kyoto Line in Minami-ku, Kyoto, Japan. It has the station number "B03".

Layout
Jūjō Station has an elevated island platform serving two tracks.

Platforms

History
1928 - The station opens as a station of Nara Electric Railroad
1963 - Naraden merges and the station becomes part of Kintetsu
1999 - The station is elevated
2007 - Introduction of PiTaPa smart card

Adjacent stations

Surrounding area
Jujo-dori
Minami Ward Office
Nintendo Global Headquarters
SG Holdings Co., Ltd., Sagawa Express Co., Ltd.

See also
 List of railway stations in Japan

References

External links

 Station Facilities and Service
 Station Map

Railway stations in Kyoto
Railway stations in Japan opened in 1928